Zak Norton Sturge (born 15 June 2004) is an English professional footballer currently playing as a left-back for Chelsea.

Club career
Born in London, Sturge started his career with the Cre8tive Football Academy, before joining Premier League side Brighton & Hove Albion in 2019. After three years in Brighton, he declined the offer of a contract extension, and announced his departure from the club in July 2022. 

After being linked with a host of German Bundesliga sides, as well as English sides Leeds United and Chelsea, he signed with the latter as a free agent in August 2022. Since signing, he has gone on to train with the first team.

International career
Sturge is eligible to represent both England and Guyana at international level. He was called up to the England national under-18 football team in late 2021, and has gone on to make six appearances.

Career statistics

Club

References

2004 births
Living people
Footballers from Greater London
English people of Guyanese descent
English footballers
England youth international footballers
Association football defenders
Brighton & Hove Albion F.C. players
Chelsea F.C. players
Black British sportspeople